Cardigan is a lost 1922 American silent war film directed by John W. Noble and starring William Collier, Jr. Set in the American Revolutionary War, it was adapted for the screen by Robert William Chambers from his own 1901 novel Cardigan.

Plot
As described in a film magazine, two years before the start of the American Revolutionary War, Michael Cardigan (Collier), a young Irishman who is ward of the English governor, is in love with Felicity Warren (Carpenter), who is known as Silver Heels. Captain Butler (Pike) is also a suitor for her hand. Cardigan is sent to deliver a message to a distant point but is betrayed by Captain Butler, and almost meets death by being burned at the stake for the murder of the children of Chief Logan (Montgomery). A runner saves him and Cardigan is later admitted to the secret councils of the Minutemen. He hears Patrick Henry (Loeffler) utter the words, "Give me liberty, or give me death!", and sees John Hancock (Willis) sign the Declaration of Independence "large so that the King may read it." There follows the ride of Paul Revere (Hume) and the Battles of Lexington and Concord and the retreat of the British, which follow with the splendid climax of the film.

Cast
William Collier, Jr. as Michael Cardigan
Betty Carpenter as Silver Heels
Thomas Cummings as Sir William Johnson
William Pike as Captain Butler
Charles Graham as Lord Dunmore
Madeleine Lubetty as Marie Hamilton
Hattie Delaro as Lady Shelton
Louis Dean as Sir John Johnson
Colin Campbell as The Weazel
Jere Austin as Jack Mount
Frank Montgomery as Chief Logan
Eleanor Griffith as Dulcina
Dick Lee as Quider
J. W. Johnston as Colonel Cresap (credited as Jack Johnston)
Florence Short as Molly Brandt
George Loeffler as Patrick Henry
William Willis as John Hancock
Austin Hume as Paul Revere

See also
The Heart of a Hero (1916)
America (1924)
 List of films about the American Revolution
 List of television series and miniseries about the American Revolution

References

External links

 
 

1922 films
1920s English-language films
1920s historical drama films
1922 lost films
1922 war films
American Revolutionary War films
American black-and-white films
American historical drama films
American silent feature films
American war films
Cultural depictions of John Hancock
Cultural depictions of Patrick Henry
Cultural depictions of Paul Revere
Films based on American novels
Films based on works by Robert W. Chambers
Films directed by John W. Noble
Films set in the 1770s
Lost American films
Lost war films
1920s American films
Silent American drama films